Grigor Marzuantsi (1662 in Marzuan city in historical Little Hayq in Western Armenia - 1730) was an Armenian book printer and engraver during the years 1705-1730. He is credited with helping establish the Armenian printing industry.

References

Armenians from the Ottoman Empire
1662 births
1730 deaths
Armenian printers